MCDC may refer to:

 Minuteman Civil Defense Corps
 Mandalay City Development Committee
 Modified Condition/Decision Coverage
 Motor City Dan Campbell (MC/DC)
 Music Choice/Dance Channel